Gray High School may refer to:

 Colonel Gray High School, Charlottetown, Prince Edward Island, Canada
 John Gray High School, George Town, Cayman Islands

See also
 Grey High School (disambiguation)